Miguel 'Migue' Marín Prieto (born 19 February 1990) is a Spanish footballer who plays as a left back for Orihuela CF.

Club career
Born in Alicún de Ortega, Province of Granada, Andalusia, Marín graduated from Villarreal CF's youth setup, and made his senior debuts with CD Toledo in the 2009–10 campaign, in Segunda División B. In the 2010 summer he moved to Granada CF B in the regional leagues, appearing regularly for the latter.

In July 2011, Marín joined another reserve side, Real Murcia Imperial of the Tercera División. On 20 May 2012 he first appeared with the first team, playing the last 15 minutes in a 2–2 home draw against Gimnàstic de Tarragona in the Segunda División.

On 12 July 2013, Marín signed for Elche CF, being assigned to the reserves who competed in the Segunda División B. On 24 June of the following year, after being a regular starter, he joined CF Reus Deportiu also in division three.

The Catalans won promotion via the playoffs in 2016, though Marín played just nine times over the whole campaign. In June that year, he left for more game time at Mérida AD. Following one season at the Estadio Romano in the third tier, he spent the next two years at that level with Atlético Baleares and FC Jumilla.

On 13 December 2019, Marín signed with Orihuela CF until the end of the season.

References

External links

1990 births
Living people
Sportspeople from the Province of Granada
Spanish footballers
Footballers from Andalusia
Association football defenders
Segunda División players
Segunda División B players
Tercera División players
CD Toledo players
Club Recreativo Granada players
Real Murcia Imperial players
Real Murcia players
Elche CF Ilicitano footballers
CF Reus Deportiu players
Mérida AD players
CD Atlético Baleares footballers
FC Jumilla players
Orihuela CF players